The Manatua One Polynesia Fibre Cable is a submarine communications cable linking Samoa, Niue, the Cook Islands, and French Polynesia. The cable is the first-ever fibre optic cable connectivity available to the Cook Islands. The 3600-km cable was manufactured in the United States by turnkey supplier SubCom, a portfolio company of Cerberus Capital Management.

The cable is an extension of the Honotua cable linking Hawaii and Tahiti. It was declared "ready for service" in July 2020.

History
The project was managed by the "Manatua Consortium", comprising OPT (Office des Postes et Télécommunications) of French Polynesia, Avaroa Cable Limited of the Cook Islands, Telecom Niue Limited of Niue, and Samoa Submarine Cable Company of Samoa.

References

Submarine communications cables
Fiber-optic communications
2020 establishments in Oceania